South Waghi Rural LLG is a local-level government (LLG) of Jiwaka Province, Papua New Guinea.

Wards
01. Aviamp 3
02. Aviamp 4
03. Aviamp 2
04. Aviamp 1
05. Kauwi
06. Kabagang
07. Kungar 2
08. Kungar 1
09. Kudjip Plnt
10. Kudjip Hospital
11. Puri
12. Kurumul 1
13. Kurumul 2
14. Tombil 1
15. Tombil 2
16. Kamang 1
17. Kamang 2
18. Anginmol
20. Ngunba Tsents
21. Gabinal
22. Alua
23. Gagwa / Dup
24. Kamang 3 / Mondomil
25. Olubus
26. Pabamil
27. Tsigmil
28. Begbe
29. Tumba
30. Numgil
31. Kugmar
32. Gugmar
33. Djek
34. Yeu 1
35. Mt. Au
36. Ambopane
37. Yeu 2
38. Olate
39. Palti
40. Tesa
41. Wusinge
42. Meru
43. Tandambak
44. Tun
45. Kupa
46. Djeck 2
47. Minj Mu
48. Kia
82. Minj Urban

References

Local-level governments of Jiwaka Province